CityLink Mall is Singapore's first underground mall, located within the One Raffles Link development at Marina Square. Opened on 1 July 2000, the  underground mall connects City Hall and Esplanade on the Mass Rapid Transit, and to Suntec City Mall, Marina Square, hotels in Marina Centre, Millenia Singapore, Raffles City and to Esplanade - Theatres on the Bay.

Tenants include FunToast, Sushi Express, KOI Café, DMK, Charles & Keith and Pedro.

Former tenants include Rubi Shoes which was closed on 14 August 2012 and New Look which was closed on 29 February 2016 and was replaced by We&Co.

External links
 
 Hongkong Land's profile on CityLink Mall

2000 establishments in Singapore
Shopping malls in Singapore
Downtown Core (Singapore)